David Michael Hope, Baron Hope of Thornes,  (born 14 April 1940) is a retired Anglican bishop. He was the Bishop of Wakefield between 1985 and 1990 and the Bishop of London between 1990 and 1995. From 1995 to 2005, he was the Archbishop of York in the Church of England. In March 2005, he was made a life peer and therefore a member of the House of Lords; he had already sat in the house as a Lord Spiritual when he was a bishop. He retired from the Lords in April 2015.

Early career
Hope was ordained deacon in 1965 and priest in 1967. After a curacy at the Church of Saint John the Baptist, Liverpool he was Vicar of Orford from 1970 to 1973. In that year he became Principal of St Stephen's House, an Anglo-Catholic theological college in Oxford, from 1974 until 1982. He was Vicar of All Saints, Margaret Street, an Anglo-Catholic church in the West End of London from 1982 to 1985.

Hope was nominated to become Bishop of Wakefield on 2 July 1985, consecrated as a bishop by John Habgood, Archbishop of York, on 18 October at York Minster and enthroned at Wakefield Cathedral on 29 October. He was translated to become Bishop of London with the confirmation of his election to that See on 2 July 1990 and enthroned at St Paul's Cathedral on 14 September. Hope was Master of the Guardians of the Shrine of Our Lady of Walsingham from 1982 to 1994.

Archbishop of York
Having become Archbishop of York with the confirmation of his election at Lambeth Palace in September/October 1995, Hope was enthroned at York Minster on 8 December 1995. After Peter Tatchell alleged in the same year that Hope was gay as part of a much criticised OutRage! "outing" campaign, Hope had said that his sexuality is "a grey area". "He said that his sexuality was 'ambiguous' and that he was celibate." On 26 October 1995 he was appointed a Knight Commander of the Royal Victorian Order (KCVO), an honour in the personal gift of the Queen. Hope was one of four English bishops who declined to sign the Cambridge Accord, an attempt in 1999 to find agreement on affirming certain human rights of homosexuals, notwithstanding differences within the church on the morality of homosexual behaviour. On 30 June 2004, together with Rowan Williams, Archbishop of Canterbury, and on behalf of all 114 Anglican bishops, he wrote to Tony Blair expressing deep concern about government policy and criticising the coalition troops' conduct in Iraq. The letter cited the abuse of Iraqi detainees, which was described as having been "deeply damaging", and stated that the government's apparent double standards "diminish the credibility of western governments". Hope conducted a series of disciplinary hearings involving errant clergy within his province.

On 1 August 2004 it was announced that Hope would step down as Archbishop of York to become a parish priest at St Margaret's Church in Ilkley. He did so on 28 February 2005.

Later years
In recognition of his contribution to the church, Downing Street announced on 25 January 2005 that Hope was to be created a life peer; the title was gazetted as Baron Hope of Thornes, of Thornes in the County of West Yorkshire, on 6 April 2005 (dated 31 March 2005). On 4 August 2006 he was appointed to the Court of Ecclesiastical Causes Reserved for a period of five years.  On 10 September 2006, Hope announced his resignation as Vicar of St Margaret's, Ilkley, owing to ill health. He stated that he intended to continue to work a three-day week at St Margaret's until the end of 2006, but after that would serve as an honorary assistant bishop in the Diocese of Bradford (and later in the successor Diocese of Leeds.) On 1 October 2007 it was announced that he would also serve as an honorary assistant bishop in the Diocese of Gibraltar in Europe; that licence lapsed in 2012. Hope has also been an honorary assistant bishop in the Diocese of Blackburn since 2008.

In April 2013, it was reported that in 1999 and 2003, Hope had been made aware of allegations of child sexual abuse against a former Dean of Manchester, Robert Waddington. Hope removed Waddington's right to officiate at services but did not refer Waddington to the authorities because of his ill health. Following the 2014 report of the Cahill Inquiry, Hope resigned his post as honorary assistant bishop in the Diocese of Leeds on 27 October 2014. He retired from the 
House of Lords on 30 April 2015.

He was present at the Accession Council which proclaimed King Charles III as Monarch on 10 September 2022.

Styles and titles
Doctor David Hope (1965)
The Reverend Doctor David Hope (1965–1985)
The Right Reverend Doctor David Hope (1985–1990)
The Right Reverend and Right Honourable Doctor David Hope (1990–1995)
The Most Reverend and Right Honourable Doctor David Hope  (199528 February 2005)
The Right Reverend and Right Honourable Doctor David Hope  (28 February31 March 2005)
The Right Reverend and Right Honourable The Lord Hope of Thornes  (31 March 2005present)

References

External links
David Hope on Desert Island Discs
Debrett's People of Today

1940 births
Living people
Members of the Privy Council of the United Kingdom
Bishops of Wakefield (diocese)
Bishops of London
Deans of the Chapel Royal
Archbishops of York
20th-century Anglican archbishops
21st-century Anglican archbishops
Crossbench life peers
Knights Commander of the Royal Victorian Order
Alumni of the University of Nottingham
Anglo-Catholic bishops
People educated at Queen Elizabeth Grammar School, Wakefield
Ordained peers
Principals of St Stephen's House, Oxford
Alumni of Linacre College, Oxford
British Anglo-Catholics
LGBT Anglican bishops
English LGBT politicians
Life peers created by Elizabeth II